Robert Van de Walle (born 20 May 1954) is a retired Belgian judoka. He was the first judoka to ever compete at five Olympics, from 1976 to 1992. Competing in the half-heavyweight category he won the gold medal in 1980 and a bronze in 1988 at the age of 34. Van de Walle won European titles in 1980, 1985 and 1986. Together with Ingrid Berghmans he was the face of Belgian judo in the late 1970s and 1980s. After retiring from competitions he ran a coaching company together with his wife. He was the head of the Belgian delegation at the 2004 Summer Olympics. In summer 2021, 14 years after obtaining the rank of black belt 8th dan; Van De Walle, currently a member of Judo Club Crossing Schaerbeek, accepted his promotion to 9th dan from the International Judo Federation.

Bibliography
(1993) "Pick-ups" Judo Masterclass Techniques Ippon Books

References

External links

 
 
 
 

1954 births
Living people
Flemish sportspeople
Belgian male judoka
Olympic judoka of Belgium
Judoka at the 1976 Summer Olympics
Judoka at the 1980 Summer Olympics
Judoka at the 1984 Summer Olympics
Judoka at the 1988 Summer Olympics
Judoka at the 1992 Summer Olympics
Olympic gold medalists for Belgium
Olympic bronze medalists for Belgium
Sportspeople from Ostend
Olympic medalists in judo
Medalists at the 1988 Summer Olympics
Medalists at the 1980 Summer Olympics
21st-century Belgian people
20th-century Belgian people